Netball in Trinidad and Tobago is a popular sport.

International Competition
Trinidad and Tobago hosted 1979 Netball World Championships

The Trinidad and Tobago national netball team won 3rd place in the 1979 Netball World Championships, and 3rd place in the 1983 Netball World Championships.

As of January 2011, the women's national team was ranked eighth in the world.

Trinidad and Tobago Netball

The Trinidad and Tobago national netball team is known as the Calypso Girls named for the music that was born from that island nation has made history in the world of netball. The sport was started in the early 1900 after slavery to empower women in the country, at that time the first athletes were the children of the slave masters who had been privilege enough to afforded opportunity to form clubs like Malvern, Maple, Harvard and Queens Park. Then in the 1930s the children of slaves were the one playing the sport. The Calypso girls represented the island nations in international netball competition and was the first Trinidad team to garner national recognition. The Trinidad team competed at the first world netball championship in 1963. Trinidad's netball flourished in the mid1900s as the women that were marginalize started to explore the possibility of competing on the world stage. There were many women who contributed to the advancement of the sport. These women were unlike the American female sport stars were welcomed by their male counterparts in the area of sports. This led to the rapid growth of the sport. At that time there were no other sport that women competed in with the exception of lawn tennis. Women like Lystra Lewis, Eugenia Theodosia Pierre, Antionette Gaskins, Ingrid Blackman and Club players like Jean Best and Phyllis Best. Made major contribution to the sport of netball, which is still played in the islands. Netball in Trinidad and Tobago is a sport that let the women of Trinidad of improve and develop in ways unimagined by the new government. This sport is the first sport that Trinidad and Tobago were able win its first world championship in 1979. The team consisted of the following ladies Ingrid Blackman, Angela Burke-Brown, Peggy Castanada, Heather Charleau, Cyrenia Charles, Marcia Dimsoy, Jennifer Nurse, Sherril Peters, Althea Thomas, Jennifer, Williams, Eugenia Theodosia Pierre, and Veryl Prescod

Netball is a sport developed at about the same time as women basketball but remain with the basic rules of the old criteria. Netball is a sport played by two teams of seven players. It was introduced to England in the 1890s and requires the abilities to catch the ball, passing is extremely important in net ball. There are five types of passes they are: bounce passes, chest passes, flick passes, lob passes and shoulder passes other than that we have footwork and shooting. There is no dribbling to advance the ball in net ball it is based totally on the passing of the ball when players get into there shooting range they have 3 seconds to shoot the ball. The sport was first played in England in 1895 at a woman's college in Kent England. Madame Ostenburg's College for women. this was a physical training school for ladies Netball's popularity continued to grow, with the game being played in many British Commonwealth countries. The two iconic women who made this sport so readily accepted were Lystra Lewis and Eugenia Theodosia Pierre

Lystra Lewis

Trinidad Netball was influenced greatly by Lystra Lewis, her career started as a youth in high school. Miss Lewis played for Tranquility secondary school in netball and later played club netball for Malvern sports club from 1940 to mid-1950s. Her love for the sport was the basis for the start of the coaching career. She was a Stallworth for the many clinics and seminars in many of the Caribbean islands. she also promoted the sport in the west indies in 1945 she was the Secretary/Treasurer of the Port-of-Spain Netball League and coached the Trinidad & Tobago National Team for the first time in 1952. She was a member of the West Indies Netball Board of Control when it was formed in 1954 and was the lone West Indian representative at the 1960 World Netball Conference in Ceylon (Sri Lanka) where the International Federation of Netball Associations (IFNA) was established. She received a scholarship from the British Council and left Trinidad to study physical education at Bedford College. She later became the first West Indian to be appointed to the All-English Panel of Umpires. She returned to Trinidad in 1961 to coach the national team and to introduce netball to primary and secondary schools. In 1962, she was the driving force behind the erection of the first official netball court in Trinidad at the Princess Building Grounds, Port-of-Spain. Lewis founded the West Indies Netball Association in 1963 and coached the national team at the inaugural World Netball Championships in 1963. She assisted in the formation of the Caribbean Netball Association in 1974 and served as an executive member of the IFNA.

Eugenia Theodosia Pierre (Jean)

These women are not known to the world at large but are recognized in the Caribbean for their accomplishments and has ensured that netball in Trinidad is vibrant and strong. Trinidad and Tobago will compete in the England in 2019 world championship.  Trinidad is ranked 10th in the world. The world of netball continues to present itself as a great ambassador for women athletes.  although played by men the sport has not found its niche. The women continue to be the force that drives the sport. The goal of the Netball nation is to empower women through sports  and physical fitness.

"Not only has netball empowered me to play a sport I love, it has given me the gift of seeing the world outside of Uganda and getting an education I could only have dreamed of. Through my journey, I hope I can inspire others to harness the power of netball in their lives to achieve their dreams too".    Peace Proscovia

References

Bibliography